Conor Alexander Maguire (16 December 1889 – 26 September 1971) was an Irish politician, lawyer and judge who served as Chief Justice of Ireland from 1946 to 1961, a Judge of the Supreme Court from 1946 to 1961, President of the High Court, a Judge of the High Court from 1936 to 1946 and Attorney General of Ireland from March 1932 to November 1932. He served as a Teachta Dála (TD) for the National University of Ireland constituency from 1932 to 1936.

Maguire was born in Claremorris, County Mayo, in 1889. He was educated at Clongowes Wood College and University College Dublin (UCD). In UCD he was a founding member of the Legal and Economic Society (now known as the University College Dublin Law Society) in 1911.

He returned to County Mayo where he practised as a barrister and was instrumental in establishing Ireland's first working Republican Courts, which usurped the existing courts, and created a forum to try offenders, resolve grievances and adjudicate on land issues.

He was first elected to Dáil Éireann as a Fianna Fáil TD for the National University constituency at the 1932 general election and was re-elected at the 1933 general election. He was appointed as Attorney General of the Irish Free State in March 1932. In November 1936, he resigned as Attorney General and as a TD on his appointment as President of the High Court and a Judge of the High Court. In 1946, he was appointed as Chief Justice of Ireland, that is the president of the Supreme Court of Ireland, where he served until 1961.

References

1889 births
1971 deaths
Alumni of University College Dublin
Attorneys General of Ireland
Chief justices of Ireland
Fianna Fáil TDs
Grand Crosses with Star and Sash of the Order of Merit of the Federal Republic of Germany
Members of the 7th Dáil
Members of the 8th Dáil
Politicians from County Dublin
Presidents of the High Court (Ireland)
Dáil Court judges
Teachtaí Dála for the National University of Ireland
20th-century Irish judges